Egon Eiermann (29 September 1904 – 20 July 1970) was one of Germany's most prominent architects in the second half of the 20th century. He was also a furniture designer. From 1947, he was Professor for architecture at the Technical University of Karlsruhe.

Biography
He archived his Abitur at the Althoff-Gymnasium and studied architecture at the Technical University of Berlin. From 1925 to 1928, he was master student of Hans Poelzig. After graduating in 1928, he gained professional experience in the construction departments of Karstadt AG in Hamburg and the Berlin electricity works. From 1931 to 1945, he was an independent architect in Berlin and initially planned residential buildings. Before World War II he had an office with fellow architect . During the Nazi era, he mainly created industrial architecture. In 1945, he escaped to Buchen in West Germany, the birthplace of the father. From 1946 to 1965, he had a shared office with Robert Hilgers. In 1948, the office was relocated to Karlsruhe. He joined the faculty of the Technische Hochschule Karlsruhe in 1947, working there on developing steel frame construction methods. During a study trip to the United States in 1950, he met Walter Gropius, Marcel Breuer and Konrad Wachsmann in Boston, and in 1956 also Ludwig Mies van der Rohe. In 1967, Eiermann chaired the jury in the architectural competition for the Olympic Park in Munich.

Personal life
In 1940, he married in Berlin interior designer Charlotte,  Friedheim (1912–2001) and in 1954 in Berlin architect Brigitte, née Feyerabendt (1924–2019). He had two children: with his first wife Andreas (born 1942), from his second marriage Anna (born 1956).

He died in Baden-Baden, aged 65. He is buried at the Buchen Cemetery.

Works
During the years of reconstruction, his steel-frame industrial buildings became exemplary. The buildings are transparent, inviting, democratic, making order visible.

A functionalist, his major works include: the textile mill at Blumberg (1951); the West German pavilion at the Brussels World's Fair (with Sep Ruf, 1958); the Embassy of Germany, Washington, D.C. (1958–1964); the highrise Langer Eugen for the German Parliament in Bonn (1965–1969); the IBM-Germany Headquarters in Stuttgart (1967–1972); and, the Olivetti building in Frankfurt (1968–1972).  By far his most famous work is the new church on the site of the Kaiser Wilhelm Memorial Church in Berlin (1959–1963).

The sets of the 1926 film The Pink Diamond were designed by Eiermann.

Source:

 1929–1930 Substation of the Berliner Elektrizitätswerke AG, Berlin-Steglitz
 1931–1933 Hesse residential building, Berlin-Lankwitz
 1936–1937 Steingroever residential building, Berlin-Grunewald
 1938 factory building and boiler house of the Degea-AG-Auergesellschaft, Berlin-Wedding
 1938–1939 expansion and conversion of the Total-Werke Foerstner & Co, Apolda
 1939–1941 factory buildings of Märkische Metallbau GmbH, Oranienburg
 1948–1950 administration and factory building of Ciba AG, Wehr/Baden
 1949–1950 handkerchief weaving mill/spinning mill, Blumberg/Black Forest
 1950–1953 administration building of the United Silk Weaving Works, Krefeld
 1951–1956 experimental power plant of the Technical University, Karlsruhe
 1953 St. Matthew Church, Pforzheim
 1953–1954 Burda Moden publishing house, Offenburg
 1954–1961 residential building, Interbau, Hansaviertel, Berlin-Tiergarten
 1955–1957 Volkshilfe administration building, Cologne
 1956–1958 German Pavilion, World Exhibition in Brussels (with Sep Ruf, exterior planning by Walter Rossow)
 1956–1960 administration building of Steinkohlebergwerke AG, Essen
 1957–1963 Kaiser Wilhelm Memorial Church, Berlin-Charlottenburg
 1958–1961 Head office of Neckermann Versand KG, Frankfurt am Main
 1958–1961 administration building of the steel structure Gustav Müller, Offenburg
 1958–1964 Chancellery building of the German Embassy, Washington
 1959–1962 Eiermann house, Baden-Baden
 1961–1967 buildings for the DEA-Scholven GmbH refinery, Karlsruhe
 1965–1969 high-rise building for members of the German Bundestag, Bonn
 1967–1972 Administration and training center of Deutsche Olivetti, Frankfurt am Main,
 1967–1972 IBM headquarters, Stuttgart-Vaihingen

Design
From 1949, the first functional and serially produced seating furniture made of wood and tubular steel was created in cooperation with the Esslingen company .

Source:

 1950 SE 68 tubular steel chair
 1952 E 10 wicker chair
 1952–1953 SE 18 wooden folding chair
 1953 table frame Eiermann 1
 1960–1961 Church seat SE 121
 1965 table frame Eiermann 2

Awards
Source:

 1962 Berlin Art Prize
 1965 honorary doctorate from the Technical University of Berlin
 1965 Grand State Prize for Architecture of the State of North Rhine-Westphalia
 1968 Grand Prize of the Association of German Architects
 1968 Grand Federal Cross of Merit
 1969  of the BDA Baden-Württemberg
 1970 Order Pour le Mérite for Science and Arts

In 1997, the Egon Eiermann Society was founded in Karlsruhe. In 2004, the Bundespost honored Eiermann with a special postage stamp. In Karlsruhe, Egon-Eiermann-Allee was named after him in 2009. One of the lecture halls in the architectural building of the Karlsruhe Institute of Technology bears his name. The  is an international ideas competition in architecture.

Memberships
Source:
 1926 Founding member of the "Group of Young Architects" ("")
 1931 Member of the Association of German Architects
 1931 Member of Deutscher Werkbund
 1951 Founding member of the German Design Council
 1955 Member of the Academy of Arts, Berlin (West), Section Architecture
 1960 Honorary member of the Central Association of Austrian Architects
 1962 Member of the planning council for the new buildings of the German Bundestag and the German Bundesrat in Bonn
 1963 Corresponding Honorary Member of the Royal Institute of British Architects
 1969 Founding member of the Housing and Environment Institute of the Hessian state government

Notes

References

Further reading

External links

 Egon Eiermann Gesellschaft e.V.

1904 births
1970 deaths
20th-century German architects
Architecture educators
German furniture designers
Academic staff of the Karlsruhe Institute of Technology
Commanders Crosses of the Order of Merit of the Federal Republic of Germany
Recipients of the Pour le Mérite (civil class)
Technical University of Berlin alumni
Olivetti people